Sumitra Devi (22 July 1923 – 28 August 1990) was an Indian actress who is recognised for her work in Hindi as well as Bengali cinema during the 1940s and 1950s. She is most remembered for her role in the 1952 Hindi film Mamta directed by Dada Gunjal. She was the recipient of BFJA Award for Best Actress for two times. She was one of the exquisite beauties of her time and has been regarded as the most beautiful woman of her time by veterans such as Pradeep Kumar and Uttam Kumar.

In 1943 she was summoned for an interview and look test in the office of New Theatres and was finally cast opposite K. L. Saigal in Hemchander Chander’s Meri Bahen (1944). During the making of this film she was offered to play the lead in Apurba Mitra’s Bengali film Sandhi (1944) which happened to be her debut film. The film achieved enormous success and won her the BFJA Award for Best Actress in 1945. In the late 1940s she established herself as a leading actress of Bollywood with roles in films such as Vasiyatnama (1945), Bhai Dooj (1947), Oonch Neech (1948) and Vijay Yatra (1948). She was adulated for her role as a single mother in Gunjal's Mamta (1952). Filmzack wrote, "She manipulated all her magnificent characteristics to vivify her role; her calmness, her softness, pain and pang and all were infused into one." She was further acclaimed for her role in films such as Deewana (1952), Ghungroo (1952), Mayurpankh (1954), Chor Bazaar (1954) and Jagte Raho (1956).

She sustained her career in Bengali cinema also with films such as Abhijog (1947), Pather Dabi (1947), Pratibad (1948), Joyjatra (1948), Swami (1949), Devi Chowdhurani (1949), Samar (1950), Dasyu Mohan (1955). Her portrayal of Bijali, a nautch girl with a bereaved heart in Haridas Bhattacharya’s National Award winning Bengali film Aandhare Alo (1957) acquired an overwhelmed critical response. She also garnered acclamation for her roles in Bengali films such as Ekdin Ratre (1956), Nilachaley Mahaprabhu (1957), Joutuk (1958) and Kinu Gowalar Gali (1964). In the late fifties, she was invited to the Asian Film Festival in China as a delegate from India.

Early life 
Sumitra Devi was born in 1923 at Shiuri, in Birbhum, West Bengal. Her original name was Nilima Chattopadhyay. Her father Murali Chattopadhyay was an advocate. Her brother's name was Ranajit Chattopadhyay. She was brought up in Muzaffarpur, Bihar. Her family shifted to Calcutta after their house and estate in Muzaffarpur was demolished due to a major earthquake.

Career
During her teenage, she was immensely influenced by the beauty and stature of the veteran actresses like Chandrabati Devi and Kanan Devi and aspired to be an actress.

She decided to send an application letter along with a photograph of her own to the office of New Theatres. As her father was conservative, she decided to do it secretly and to make her plan fruitful, she sought the help of her younger brother Ranajit, who agreed to cooperate with her. Her letter was answered and she was summoned for an interview and look test. At the office of New Theatres, she was asked to read lines from Tarasankar Bandyopadhyay's Ganadevata and she mesmerized everyone present there with her beauty as well as her lucid, euphonic voice. She was chosen for the leading role opposite K. L. Saigal in New Theatres's Meri Bahen (1944). Nilima adopted her screen name Sumitra Devi.
Though Meri Bahen was supposed to be the debut film of Sumitra Devi, she finally made her debut with Apurba Mitra's Bengali film Sandhi (1944), which became a huge hit at the box office. There are different speculations regarding how she attained her role in Sandhi (1944). Anandalok wrote that she was stalled on her way to the shooting floor of Meri Bahen, by Apurba Mitra who offered her to act in his directorial venture. Cineplot claimed that it was actually Sumitra Devi herself who proposed Debaki Bose to act in his film and it was Bose who finally cast her in his nephew Apurba Mitra's directorial venture. According to the source, Bose wanted to enquire whether she had her father's consent to step into filmdom. She confessed that she did not have and her father was too conservative to provide his consent to this. As Bose was keen to cast her, he requested B. N. Sircar to persuade her father, Murali Chattopadhyay to give his consent. As B. N. Sircar was the son of Sir M. N. Sirkar, an eminent advocate and a close friend to Murali Chattopadhyay, he finally yielded to Sircar's imploration and reluctantly gave his consent. After the film had been released, she was applauded for her unlaboured acting skill as well as credited as having an "outstanding luminous screen presence". The film won her the Bengal Film Journalists' Association - Best Actress Award in 1945. Meri Bahen (1944) achieved remarkable success upon release. It became the fourth highest-grossing film of the year. She, then appeared in Soumyen Mukhopadhyay's Hindi film Vasiyatnama (1945) which was originally an adaptation of veteran Bengali author Bamkim Chandra Chattopadhyay's famous novel Krishnakanter Will. In this film, she played the character of a beautiful widow who seduces the male protagonist, elopes with him and ultimately gets killed by him. She earned rave reviews for her enticing as well as doleful performance in the film. Filmstaan wrote, "She had that melancholia which she manipulated together with her beauty to vitalize the character of Rohini." Her next big turn was Satish Dasgupta and Digambar Chattopadhay's directorial venture Pather Dabi (1947) which was an adaptation of the renowned Bengali author Sarat Chandra Chattopadhyay's novel of the same name and also starred Debi Mukherjee in lead. The film was a massive success at box office as its content dealt with the various aspects of contemporary Indian freedom movement. She attained positive review from critics for her performance in the film. She was again paired with Mukherjee in Sushil Majumdar's Abhijog (1947), which became another huge success at box office. Her next turn was Hemchandra Chandra's bilingual venture Oonch Neech (1948) whose Bengali version was released under the title Pratibad. The film achieved an enormous commercial success on both the national and regional front. She appeared in Niren Lahiri's bilingual film Vijay Yatra (1948) whose Bengali version was released under the title Joyjatra. Her next big turn was Satish Dasgupta's Devi Chowdhurani (1949) which was an adaptation of the renowned Bengali author Bankim Chandra Chattopadhyay's classic novel of the same name. She delineated the character of a Prafulla who is abandoned by her clink, gets kidnapped by some ruffians but manages to escape and hides herself in a lone forest where she meets a person who trains her as the leading figure of his gang of robbers. She earned mixed review for her performance in the film as several connoisseurs adjudged her too buxom to fit in the character and criticised her stating that she lacked the vim and vigour of Prafulla. The film was a major success at box office.

In 1950, she appeared in Nitin Bose's Hindi film Mashaal, which is based on Rajani, a famous Bengali novel by the veteran author Bankim Chandra Chottopadhyay. She played the character of Tarangini who is in love with the character of Samar, played by Ashok Kumar, but is compelled by her father to marry a wealthy landlord. The film achieved critical as well as commercial success. The year 1952 saw four of her Bollywood releases Deewana, Ghunghroo, Mamta, Raja Harischandra. Deewana and Ghunghroo received remarkable success at box office. Her other releases were Mayurpankh (1954), Chor Bazaar (1954), Jagte Raho (1956) and Delhi Darbar (1956), to name a few.

In 1955, she appeared in Ardhendu Mukhopadhyay's Bengali film Dasyu Mohan, which became a huge hit at the box office. In 1956, she appeared in Pinaki Mukhopadhyay's Bengali film Asabarna (1956) and Kartik Chattopadhyay's blockbuster Saheb Bibi Golam (1956), which is an adaptation of Bimal Mitra's classic novel of the same name. She plays the character of a beautiful, alcoholic wife of an aristocrat, who forms a loving yet platonic relationship with the protagonist Bhootnath. She has been most remembered for her role in this film. Director Kartik Chattopadhyay was keen to cast her in the role of the beautiful, eeyorish mistress of the junior landlord, but felt on edge at the same time as he thought that she might be repulsed by this role as it mirrored her conjugal life to some extent. He found his breath when Sumitra Devi gave her consent.

The film was released on 9 March 1956 and turned out as a massive hit at the box office. In 1957, she appeared in Kartik Chattopadhyay's another blockbuster Nilachaley Mahaprabhu. She was further adulated for her role as a nautch girl in Haridas Bhattacharya's National Award winning film Aandhare Alo (1957).

In 1958, she was paired with Uttam Kumar in Jiban Gangopadhgay's ambitious venture Joutuk. Sumitra Devi's reign began to slow down in the sixties. In 1964, she rendered the character of Draupadi in Chandrakant Gor's Hindi film Veer Bhimsen. In the same year, she appeared in O. C. Gangopadhyay's Kinu Gowalar Gali, where she played the character of a woman who is desperate to win back her husband's love for her.

Personal life 
Sumitra Devi married actor Debi Mukherjee on 21 October 1946. On 1 December 1947, she gave birth to her son Bulbul and on 11 December 1947, Mukherjee passed away.

Trivia

Sumitra Devi was known for her exquisite beauty and subtle administration of seduction. It was said that she often cast her spell on the actors, directors, producers and journalists of her time. Her Dasyu Mohan co-actor Pradeep Kumar, who described her as an "instance of the perfect harmonization of beauty and glory", used to come to the set of the film even when he had no schedule of shooting and spend his time sitting by and watching her raptly. Uttam Kumar too, was spellbound before her on the set of Kartik Chattopadhyay's Saheb Bibi Golam.  Raj Kapoor said: "Sumitra Devi doesn't need any reference; she is beautiful than anything else." Shammi Kapoor said: "She has the face that can arrest an unblinking gaze for long."

Filmography

Hindi Films

Bengali films

References

External links

Sumitra Devi on Facebook

Bengali actresses
Actresses from West Bengal
1923 births
1990 deaths
People from Birbhum district
Actresses in Hindi cinema
Actresses in Bengali cinema
Indian film actresses
20th-century Indian actresses